Metaxochori is a village and a community of the Agia municipality. The 2011 census recorded 478 inhabitants in the village. The community of Metaxochori covers an area of 3.024 km2.

Geography
Metaxochori is located two kilometres to the northwest of Agia, at the foot of Mount Ossa. The village is separated in two parts, with a small stream and a small bridge connecting each other.

Economy
The inhabitants are principally engaged in the cultivation of apple and cherry and the area is known for its silk production.

Population
According to the 2011 census, the population of the settlement of Metaxochori was 478 people, a decrease of almost 13% compared with the population of the previous census of 2001.

See also
 List of settlements in the Larissa regional unit

References

Populated places in Larissa (regional unit)